Dina Goldstein (born 1969) is a visual artist based in Vancouver, British Columbia, Canada. She is a photographer and pop surrealist with a background in documentary photography.
Goldstein creates tableau with a nuanced visual language that places the mundane and everyday in unusual settings to inspire insight into the human condition. She is most known for her series "Fallen Princesses", created in 2007, which depicts humanized Disney Princesses placed in realistic, modern scenarios. The series envisions how the lives of these famous characters would have played out in the real world, and touches on such everyday scourges as poverty, obesity, cancer and pollution. Goldstein was awarded the Arte Laguna special prize in 2012. In 2014, Goldstein won the grand prize at Prix Virginia; her work was exhibited in Paris, France.

Early life and education 
Dina Goldstein was born in Tel Aviv, Israel, and in 1976 emigrated to Canada. Goldstein studied art history and photography at Langara College in Vancouver, B.C., and completed her studies in 1993.

Photography 
Goldstein's career in photography started with photojournalism and documentary work (1993–2000), she went on to photograph editorial and commissioned work for magazines and advertising agencies (2000–2009). Her first public exhibition was Images of Gaza (2001), a series of black and white portraits of people living in the West Bank and Gaza.

'Fallen Princesses' (2009)
Goldstein's first large-scale tableau series Fallen Princesses debuted publicly in 2009. The series was exhibited in numerous galleries, at group show at BYU Museum of Art, and in the Musée De La Femme in Quebec, Canada in 2013.

The series consists of 10 photographs depicting Disney Princesses and other Fairy Tale characters placed within a modern environment. By embracing the textures and colors created by Walt Disney, which built a multibillion-dollar empire exploiting these fairy tales, the work questions the notion of the idealistic 'Happily Ever After' motif, composed by Disney, and spoon fed to children throughout the world.

'In the Dollhouse' (2012)
In a series of large-format photographic tableaus, Goldstein creates a storyline for the Barbie and Ken dolls, using real-life models. Trapped in a loveless marriage, Ken struggles with his sexuality. Using sequential story-telling, Goldstein creates a bright, plastic, pop-surrealist narrative. "The series unfolds a tragicomic tale of the perils of being plastic and the potential for salvation through authenticity. Barbie gets the short end of that stick – in Goldstein’s telling of her story, she endures psychological dysfunction, an emotional breakdown, a really bad haircut and, ultimately, decapitation. Ken finds his authenticity and finally realizes true happiness".

'Gods of Suburbia' (2014)

"Gods of Suburbia is Goldstein’s third large-scale project. The work is a visual analysis of religious faith within the context of the modern forces of technology, science and secularism. The series plays with narrative and religious iconography in order to communicate how organized belief has become twisted within a global framework driven by consumerism and greed" 

"By constructing a cosmetic reality, one that mirrors our own, Goldstein doesn't evade discussion, but rather creates it. In doing so, Gods and deities, believed to be too sacred for criticism, are personified and whose religious practices contradict their dogma".

'Modern Girl' (2016) 
Modern Girl 2016, Inspired by Chinese advertising posters of the 1930s, Modern Girl examines identity, gender roles, diasporic cultures, and consumerism. By re-imagining iconic Chinese advertisements to critique the beauty, health and wellness industries, Modern Girl investigates how traditional gender roles, and individualistic consumer values have constructed and used women's bodies to market and sell products. According to Goldstein, the visual source inspiration of 1930's Chinese advertising posters is central in capturing the tensions of past traditions and the push for modernity: "The breaking away from filial tradition in this era saw the emergence of Asian women coming into their individuality," says Goldstein. "At the same time, modern gender roles and expectations opened the door to exploit the female form for marketing and advertising campaigns."

'Snapshots From The Garden Of Eden' (2017) 
Snapshots From The Garden Of Eden (2017), was commissioned by the Contemporary Jewish Museum Of San Francisco for the group exhibit Jewish Folktales Retold: Artist as Maggid; based on 100 Jewish tales, collected and retold by folklorist Howard Schwartz, in the book 'Leaves From The Garden Of Eden'. For this Goldstein photographed a series of 11 large-scale black and white theatrical images, modernized scenes from each of the four primary types of tales: fairy tales, folktales, supernatural tales and mystical tales. The series features rich and ethnically diverse characters, made up of divine royalty, temptresses, supernatural spirits, and Hasidic figures. Goldstein uses dreamscapes and symbolism to explore, and subvert popular traditional Jewish themes like destiny, temptation, justice, wisdom, blind faith and circumstance. Snapshots From The Garden Of Eden is a traveling series, exhibited at the Museo Ebraico, Venice, in 2018, and currently being presented internationally at Jewish museums and centers.

'The 10 Commandments' (2019) 
Dina Goldstein's latest work The 10 Commandments (2019), inspired by the election of Donald Trump in 2016, exposes the deceit, hypocrisy and misogyny displayed within the US body politic. The series seeks to examine the socio-political makeup of America through its political icons, the presidential figures that mark the most notable and controversial chapters in American history. Each tableau features a President portrayed through the prism of their politics, popularity and/or notoriety, further contextualized by a contemporary backdrop, and assigned one of the postulates of the Ten Commandments. These, often humorous, narrative juxtapositions aim to deconstruct the layers of political deceit, exposing latent hypocrisies and challenging the integrity of a system that is supposed to be a model of democracy and social progress. Although most political of her work yet, it aligns with the theme she continues to revisit in her art, one of disillusionment.

Awards 
 2020		Aesthetica Art Prize, Finalist
2020		Arte Laguna, Photographic section, Finalist
2019		Lucie Awards, Deeper Perspective,  Honourable Mention
2019		Honourable Mention Julia Margaret Cameron Awards
2018		Arte Laguna, Belgium Residency Selection
2017		Black & White Spider Awards
2016		Sony Awards Short list
 2016		Arte Laguna, Photographic Selection
 2014		Prix Virginia, Paris, France Grand Prize
 2013		International Color Awards, Fine Art Finalist
 2012		The Big F Award, Framed Awards
 2012		Selected for Art Basel
 2011		Arte Laguna Special Prize Winner
 2009		Popular Photography, reader's competition
 2009		International Color Awards, Fine Art Finalist
 2008		1st Place ‘Magazine Cover Art’, Applied Arts Magazine
 2006		Nominee, ‘David Screams’, Black and White Spider Awards
 2006		1st Place, ‘Ice Cream’, International Colour Awards
 2004		1st Place, ‘Hands’, Applied Arts Magazine
 2004		1st Place, ‘Trackrecord Exhibit Poster’ Applied Arts Magazine
 2003		3rd Place, ‘Trackrecord Exhibit Poster’, Nikon PDN awards
 2003		Top 10 Ice Cream Photo Life Magazine
 2002		Nominee, ‘Manifesto of Fun’, Western Magazine Awards
 2001		Nominee, ‘Home Wrecked’, Western Magazine Awards
 1999		Nominee, ‘Dig It’, Western Magazine Awards

Notable exhibitions

Solo and group exhibitions
2020

Solo, Museum of Jewish Montreal, Montreal, Canada Snapshots From The Garden Of Eden Curator: Alyssa Stokvis-Hauer
Solo, Art Mur Gallery, Montreal, Canada Gods Of Suburbia Curator: Rheal Lanthier
Solo, Castle of Compiano, Parma, Italy Fallen Princesses Curators: Opus in Artem
Solo, Masterpiece Art, London, England. Modern Girl Curator: Alex Cousens
Group, The Arts Company, Nashville, USA Dollhouse, Fallen Princesses Curator: Langley Burton
Group, Aesthetica Art Prize, Future Now, York Gallery London, England. Princess, Snapshots From The Garden Of Eden Curator: Cherie Federico

2019

Group, Musée de l’Homme, Paris, France. Alimentations: Nourritures/ Cultures/ Natures, The Last Supper, East Vancouver, 2014. Curators: Virginio Gaudenzi, Alexis Amen
Group, Juming Museum, Taipei, Chance and Coincidence, Taiwan. Fallen Princesses Curator: Hung-Chih Wang
Group, Pasinger Fabrik, Yes We Ken, Munich, Germany. In The Dollhouse Curators: Augusta Laar, Stefan-Maria Mittendorf
Solo, Head On Photography Festival, Sydney, Australia. Gods Of Suburbia Curator: Moshe Rosenzveig

2018

Solo, Addis Foto Festival, Addis Ababa, Ethiopia. Gods Of Suburbia, Curator: Aida Muluneh
Solo, Museo della Padova Ebraica, Padua, Italy. Snapshots From The Garden Of Eden, Curator: Domenico Maria Papa
Solo, Castello Cavour, Turin, Italy. Art Site Festival. Fallen Princesses. Curator: Domenico Maria Papa
Solo,Venice Jewish Museum, Venice, Italy. Snapshots From The Garden Of Eden. Curator: Marcella Ansaldi
Solo, Basilica of Sant'Ambrogio, Milan, Italy. Gods and Princesses Curator: Opus In Artem
Group, Ian Potter Museum, University of Melbourne, Australia. 'All the better to see you with: Fairytales transformed’ Curator: Samantha Comte

2017

Festival, Lishui Biennial Photography Festival, Lishui Museum, China. Where Does The Future Get Made? Gods Of Suburbia. Curator: James Ramer
Solo, Sidney and Gertrude Zack Gallery, Jewish Center, Vancouver, B.C. Snapshots From The Garden Of Eden. Curator: Linda Lando
Group, Contemporary Jewish Museum, San Francisco, US. Jewish Folktales Retold: Artist as Maggid. Curators: Pierre-François Galpin, Renny Pritikin
Festival, Contact Photography Festival, Toronto, Ont. Fallen Princesses. Curator: Belinda Chum Gallery House
Festival, Auckland Festival Of Photography, Auckland, NZ. Gods Of Suburbia Curator: Shahidul Alam
Group, Leaves from the Garden Of Eden: One Hundred Classic Jewish Tales, Contemporary Jewish Museum, San Francisco. "Curator: Pierre-François Galpin" → ·issou· ←

2016
 Festival, Daegu Photo Biennale, Daegu South Korea. Curator: Issack Kim
 Solo, Palazzo Flangini, Venice, Italy. Curator: Galleria Bianca Maria Rizzi
 Solo, Mesa Contemporary Arts Museum, Mesa, Arizona. Curator: Tiffany Fairall
 Group, Once Upon in A Fairy Tale, Mart Photography Centre Yekaterinberg, Russia. Curator: Artem Berkovich
 Solo, Dina Goldstein, Modern Girl, Virginie Barrou Planquart, Paris, France. Curator: Virginie Barrou Planquart
 Solo, Gods Of Suburbia, Capture Photo Festival, Vancouver. Curator: Kim Spencer-Nairn
 Group, The Girl Next Door, Haarlem, Holland
 Group, Palm Springs Fine Art Fair, Palm Springs, USA
 Solo, Collections, Central Dupon, Paris, France
 Festival, Gods Of Suburbia, Art Souterrain, Montreal, Quebec. Curator: Raymond Cantin
 Solo, In The Dollhouse, Rize Gallery, Amsterdam, Holland. Curator: Immechien Bonnet
 Solo, Gods Of Suburbia, Madison Gallery, CA, USA. Curator: Lorna York

2015
 Festival, Fallen Princesses, Rencontres Internationales de la Photographie En Gaspesie, Quebec, Canada. Curator: Claude Goulet.
 Solo, Fallen Princesses, Playtime Productions and Opiom Gallery- Public Exhibition, Mediathèque, Mouans-Sartoux, France. Curator: Hélène Girault 
 Festival, In the Dollhouse, Fotografica Bogota Bianal- Photography Museum Colombia. Museum Director: Gilma Suárez 
2014
 Solo, In the Dollhouse and Fallen Princesses, Prix Virginia Overall winner, Paris, France: Jury Curated Organizers: Marie Descourtieux and Sylvia Schildge 
 Festival, Fallen Princesses, Rencontres Internationales De La Photographie En Gaspésie, Quebec, Canada Jury Curated: Festival Director, Claude Goulet 
 Group, Gods Of Suburbia, Sakshi Gallery, Mumbai, India. Curator: Igor Zanti / Arte Laguna 
 Catalogue Inclusion, In The Dollhouse, Musée d'Orsay Paris, France, Frida Kahlo and Diego Rivera Catalogue Curator: Marie-Paule Vial, Director. Musée de l'Orangerie 
 Solo, XX, 20 Year Retrospective, Capture Photo Festival, Vancouver, British Columbia, Canada 
 Festival, In The Dollhouse, Capture Photo Festival, Kimoto Gallery, Vancouver, British Columbia, Canada, Curator: Katsumi Kimoto 
 Solo, In The Dollhouse, Art Mur Gallery, Montreal, Quebec, Canada Curator: Rheal Lanthier  
 Group, Works On Paper, Papier 13, Montreal, Quebec, Canada Curator: Committee Papier 13  
 Solo, Fallen Princesses, Musee Femme, Quebec Traveling exhibition, Curator: Marie-Eve Desautels  
 Group, Fallen Princesses, Brigham Young University Museum of Art, We Could Be Heros, Utah, U.S.A. Curator: Jeff Lambson 
 Group, Fallen Princesses, OUT / OFF - Mumbai, India Curator: Kanchi Mehta, Chameleon Art Projects 
 Group, Fallen Princesses, Venice Arsenale, Arte Laguna, Venice, Italy, Curator: Igor Zanti 
 Group, Fallen Princesses, Please Lie to Me, Art Mûr's 15th Anniversary 
2010
 Festival, Fallen Princesses, Bielsko-Biala FotoArt Festival, Poland, Curator: Inez Baturo
 Solo, Fallen Princesses, Buschlen Mowatt Gallery, Vancouver, British Columbia, Canada, Curator: Barrie Mowatt 
2005
 Solo, Trackrecord, Gallery L’Opera, 2004 Paris, France, Curator: Guy Berube
2004
 Solo, Trackrecord, Pendulum Gallery, Vancouver, B.C.
2003
 Group, David, Exposure Gallery, Vancouver, B.C. Curator: Ian McGuffie
2001
 Solo, Images of Gaza, Naamat Gallery, Tel Aviv, Israel Sidney and Gertrude Gallery, Vancouver, B.C

Personal life
Goldstein lives in East Vancouver with her filmmaker husband, Jonas Quastel. She has two daughters, Jordan and Zoe.

References

External links

 
2020 The Guardian, The 10 Commandments
DOHO MAGAZINE - The 10 Commandments
The Sydney Morning Herald
Arttribune 
KQED
L'Oeil De La Photography
Dina Goldstein and Pop Surrealism
China girl: Dina Goldstein's Satirical Pinups
AI-AP: Profiles
Dina Goldstein, Modern Girls
*Times Of Israel
NERDsociety Interview
In The Dollhouse in Feature Shoot
2013 Moulot, Dora. Le Monde- France
2013 Sarno, Marco. La Repubblica- Italy
2013 Folie-Boivin, Émilie. Le Devoir- Canada
Dark and Twisted Fairy Tales

1969 births
Living people
Artists from Vancouver
Canadian photographers
Canadian photojournalists
Canadian women artists
Jewish Canadian artists
Israeli emigrants to Canada
Israeli Jews
People from Tel Aviv
Jewish Canadian journalists